Father Thomas Plowden, SJ (1594 – 13 February 1664) was an English Jesuit to whom has been traditionally attributed an important translation under  the name Thomas Salusbury.

Life
Thomas Plowden was born in Oxfordshire, the third son of Francis Plowden of Shiplake Court (Oxfordshire) and Wokefield Park (Berkshire), and the younger brother of Edmund Plowden (colonial governor). His grandfather, Edmund Plowden, despite openly refusing to abandon his faith, faithfully served Queen Elizabeth I.

"In 1617 Thomas Plowden of Shiplake became a Jesuit. He was a grandson of the Elizabethan lawyer Edmund Plowden."

Father Plowden was sent on the English Mission about 1622. He was seized, with other priests, by pursuivants in 1628 at Clerkenwell, the London residence of the Jesuits, where h filled various offices of the order, despite the perils of the Mission in London until his death there.

Translation
As was the case with his contemporary Fr Nathaniel Bacon (SJ), English Jesuits, given their illegal status as recusants, often published under assumed names. Father Plowden presented his translations under the name of the distinguished Welsh Salusbury family. Shakespeare's The Phoenix and the Turtle (1601) is dedicated to John Salusbury, also the name of a Welsh Jesuit priest during the Jacobean era. 

During the Civil War Sir Thomas Salusbury, 2nd Baronet was MP from Denbigh. Under such a name, as resonant as his own among the Catholic gentry, Fr. Plowden translated from the Italian of Daniello Bartoli The Learned Man Defended and Reformed (London, 1660). With letters of dedication to George Monk and William Prynne, Plowden offers a Jesuit literary contribution to the Restoration by making Bartoli's "happy pen" speak English too. The celebrated L'huomo di lettere originally appeared in Rome (1645). It had become a Baroque bestseller through dozens of editions in Italian and translations by the time Fr. Plowden presented it under the name of Salusbury at the press of the mathematician and surveyor William Leybourn and sold by the well known bookseller and publisher Thomas Dring "near St. Dunstan's Church" on Fleet Street in 1660.

If the attribution of this translation to Plowden is correct, then the appearance of the following work in the next year and with the same printer bears close examination. Most now attribute it to the real "Thomas Salusbury, Esq.", younger brother of Sir John Salusbury, 3rd Baronet. This is the Mathematical Collections with translations of Galileo, Dialogue Concerning the Two Chief World Systems (1632) and works of Kepler, Castelli, Tartaglia and other European authors significant for the scientific culture of the Restoration whose diffusion it was Leybourn's purpose to promote. It is dedicated to Sir John Denham, a poet and the predecessor of Sir Christopher Wren as Surveyor of the King's Works and a member of the newly founded Royal Society. The introduction promises to follow up with a life of Galileo, recently identified, also the work of the same Thomas Salusbury.

Texts

References

Sources

  The entry cites:
 Henry Foley, Records of the English Province of the Society of Jesus, I, VII

1594 births
1664 deaths
17th-century English Jesuits
People from Shiplake
Date of birth unknown